John Troxell is an American college football coach and former player. He is the head football coach at Lafayette College in Easton, Pennsylvania, a position to which he was hired in December 2021. Troxell served as the head football coach at Franklin & Marshall College in Lancaster, Pennsylvania from 2006 to 2021.

Head coaching record

References

External links
 Franklin & Marshall profile

Year of birth missing (living people)
Living people
American football safeties
Columbia Lions football coaches
Franklin & Marshall Diplomats football coaches
Lafayette Leopards football coaches
Lafayette Leopards football players
Muhlenberg Mules football coaches